WKN may stand for:

 Wertpapierkennnummer, a German securities identification code
 World Kickboxing Network